WCCN may refer to:

 WCCN-FM, a radio station (107.5 FM) licensed to Neillsville, Wisconsin, United States
 WCCN (AM), a radio station (1370 AM) licensed to Neillsville, Wisconsin, United States